William Watson (born 4 June 1900) was a Scottish footballer who played for Kilmarnock, Dumbarton, Galston and Beith.

References

1900 births
Scottish footballers
Dumbarton F.C. players
Scottish Football League players
Year of death missing
Kilmarnock F.C. players
Nithsdale Wanderers F.C. players
Galston F.C. players
Beith F.C. players
Association football inside forwards
Footballers from East Ayrshire